"Marinero" is a song recorded by Colombian singer Maluma . It was released on 4 May 2018, as the sole promotional single from Maluma's third studio album F.A.M.E. (2018). It was written by Maluma, Bryan Lezcano, Kevin Jiménez and Edgar Barrera, and was produced by Edge. The promotional single has peaked at number 27 on the Billboard Hot Latin Songs chart and at number 51 on the Spanish PROMUSICAE songs chart.

Music video
The music video for "Marinero" premiered on 4 May 2018 on Maluma's Vevo account on YouTube. It was directed by Miko Ho and Maluma himself. The music video starts with Maluma entering an establishment by himself that appears to be a bar. He then quickly sits down at a table and is immediately handed a bottle of liquor by a waiter. As Maluma prepares to take a sip of the bottle that was just handed to him, he decides to first remove the sunglasses that he has been wearing throughout the video up until this moment. Maluma's eyes are then revealed to be full of tears, implying that the singer is in a current state of melancholy. He then drifts around the bar until he decides to get up on stage to momentarily sing until the weight of his feelings get to him and he slumps down on the stage to light a cigar. The video then ends with Maluma crying and leaving the building.

Track listing

Charts

Weekly charts

Year-end charts

Release history

References

2018 songs
2018 singles
Maluma songs
Spanish-language songs
Latin pop songs
Sony Music Latin singles
Sony Music Colombia singles
Songs written by Maluma (singer)
Songs written by Edgar Barrera
Song recordings produced by Edgar Barrera